The 32nd Venice Biennale, held in 1964, was an exhibition of international contemporary art, with 34 participating nations. The Venice Biennale takes place biennially in Venice, Italy. Winners of the Gran Premi (Grand Prize) included American painter Robert Rauschenberg, Swiss sculptor Zoltan Kemeny, German draughtsman Joseph Fassbender, and Italians sculptor Andrea Cascella, sculptor Arnaldo Pomodoro, and etcher Angelo Savelli.

Rauschenberg's selection for the Golden Lion marked the United States' ascendancy over European artistic dominance, and the entrance of pop art into canon.

References

Bibliography

Further reading 

 
 
 
 
 
 
 
 
 
 
 
 
 
 
 
 
 
 
 
 
 
 
 

1964 in art
1964 in Italy
Venice Biennale exhibitions